Vanderson Gomes Crisóstomo (born 26 September 1986), known as Vandinho, is a Brazilian footballer who plays for Nova Iguaçu as a midfielder.

In 2013, he joined to Coquimbo Unido.

External links
 Profile at BDFA 
 
 Vandinho at ZeroZero (in Portuguese)

1986 births
Living people
Footballers from Rio de Janeiro (city)
Brazilian footballers
Brazilian expatriate footballers
Volta Redonda FC players
Botafogo Futebol Clube (SP) players
Centro de Futebol Zico players
Coquimbo Unido footballers
Deportes Iberia footballers
Desportiva Ferroviária players
Cobreloa footballers
Americano Futebol Clube players
Associação Desportiva Itaboraí players
Duque de Caxias Futebol Clube players
Nova Iguaçu Futebol Clube players
Sampaio Corrêa Futebol e Esporte players
Goytacaz Futebol Clube players
Campeonato Brasileiro Série D players
Primera B de Chile players
Brazilian expatriate sportspeople in Chile
Expatriate footballers in Chile
Association football midfielders